Monnechroma azureum is a species of beetle in the family Cerambycidae. It was described by Demets in 1976. It is known from Mexico and Costa Rica.

References

Callichromatini
Beetles described in 1976